Charles O'Reilly (died 1800) was an Irish Roman Catholic prelate who served as the Bishop of Kilmore from 1798 to 1800.

He was appointed the Coadjutor Bishop of the Kilmore and Titular Bishop of Fussala by Pope Pius VI on 17 May 1793. On the death of Denis Maguire, O'Reilly automatically succeeded as the diocesan bishop of Kilmore on 23 December 1798.

Bishop O'Reilly died in office on 6 March 1800.

Notes

References

 
 

Year of birth unknown
1800 deaths
18th-century Roman Catholic bishops in Ireland
Roman Catholic bishops of Kilmore